Louis-Armand de La Poype de Vertrieu (Paris, 2 February 1721 – London, 12 May 1801) was a French Navy officer and statesman.

Biography 
In 1763, Vertrieux was given command of the frigate Pléïade for a mission against the Salé Rovers. Pléïade patrolled between Oran and Algiers, with Suffren as first officer and Flotte as second officer, and along with the xebecs Singe and Caméléon. On 15 July 1763, Singe mistakenly engaged a galiot from Algiers, which she mistook for a Salé rover. Pléïade intervened fired two broadsides into the galiot, which sank with all hands before the error was realised. This triggered a diplomatic incident and Captain Fabry had to negotiate a resolution to the crisis. Vertrieux fell out of favour due to the incident.

Sources and references 
 Notes

References

 Bibliography
 
 
 
 

French Navy admirals
1721 births
1801 deaths
Military personnel from Paris